Nationality words link to articles with information on the nation's poetry or literature (for instance, Irish or France).

Events
February 16 – It is announced that 300 poems by Samuel Taylor Coleridge have been discovered.
February 17 – Sotheby's announce discovery of four Walt Whitman notebooks.
March 1 – The Dylan Thomas Centre in Swansea (Wales) is opened by Jimmy Carter. 
May 26 – Cannes Film Festival première of movie Dead Man, written and directed by Jim Jarmusch, about a man named William Blake on a trek through the American West who is taken as the resurrected Romantic poet by a character named Nobody.

Works published
Listed by nation where the work was first published and again by the poet's native land, if different; substantially revised works listed separately:

Australia
Jennifer Harrison: Mosaics & Mirrors: Composite poems (Black Pepper)
Chris Mansell, Day Easy Sunlight Fine in Hot Collation (Penguin, Melbourne) 
Chris Wallace-Crabbe, Selected Poems 1956-1994, Oxford: Oxford University Press, Australia

Canada
Margaret Atwood, Morning in the Burned House, McClelland & Stewart
Anne Carson, Plainwater: Essays and Poetry, Knopf
Roy Miki, Random Access File, Canada
John Reibetanz, Morning Watch
Joe Rosenblatt, A Tentacled Mother. (in the original plus new sonnets) Exile.
Joe Rosenblatt,The Rosenblatt Reader. (selected poems and prose, 1962–1995) Exile.
Raymond Souster, No Sad Songs Wanted Here. Ottawa: Oberon Press.

India, in English
Meena Alexander, River and Bridge ( Poetry in English ), Toronto: TSAR Press and New Delhi: Rupa, by an Indian writing living in and published in the United States and India
Sujata Bhatt, The Stinking Rose ( Poetry in English ), Carcanet Press and New Delhi: Penguin
Keki Daruwalla, A Summer of Tigers ( Poetry in English ), New Delhi: Indus
A. K. Ramanujan, The Collected Poems of A.K. Ramanujan ( Poetry in English ), Delhi: Oxford University Press; posthumously published
Sudeep Sen, Dali’s Twisted Hands ( Poetry in English), New York City: White Swan Books; Leeds: Peepal Tree, 
Tejdeep, Caught in a Stampede ( Poetry in English ), New Delhi: Sterling Publishers Private Limited
K. Satchidanandan, Summer Rain: Three Decades of Poetry, edited by R. D. Yuyutsu; New Delhi: Nirala Publishers

Ireland
Patrick Crotty (editor), editor, Modern Irish Poetry: An Anthology, Belfast, The Blackstaff Press Ltd., 
Gerald Dawe, Heart of Hearts, Oldcastle: The Gallery Press, 
John Montague, Collected Poems, including "Small Secrets", Oldcastle: The Gallery Press
Maurice Riordan, A Word from the Loki, including "Milk", "A Word from the Loki" and "Time Out"", Faber and Faber, Irish poet published in the United Kingdom

New Zealand
Fleur Adcock (New Zealand poet who moved to England in 1963) and Jacqueline Simms, editors, The Oxford Book of Creatures, verse and prose anthology, Oxford: Oxford University Press
Jenny Bornholdt, How We Met, New Zealand
Janet Charman, end of the dry, Auckland: Auckland University Press
Robin Hyde, The Victory Hymn, 1935-1995, with an essay by Michele Leggott; Auckland: Holloway Press, New Zealand
Mark Williams and Michele Leggott, editors, Opening the Book : New Essays on New Zealand Writing Auckland: Auckland University Press, criticism

United Kingdom
Fleur Adcock (New Zealand poet who moved to England in 1963) and Jacqueline Simms, editors, The Oxford Book of Creatures, verse and prose anthology, Oxford: Oxford University Press
James Berry, Hot Earth, Cold Earth
Alison Brackenbury, 1829, Carcanet Press, 
Gerry Cambridge, The Shell House, Scottish Cultural Press, 
Flora Garry, Collected poems
Tony Harrison, The Shadow of Hiroshima
Ted Hughes, New Selected Poems 1957–1994
Jan Kochanowski: Laments, a cycle of Polish Renaissance elegies, translated by Seamus Heaney and Stanisław Barańczak, Faber & Faber
Michael Longley, The Ghost Orchid
Derek Mahon, The Hudson Letter. Gallery Press
Sean O'Brien, Ghost Train (Oxford University Press)
Peter Reading, Collected Poems 1970–1984
Maurice Riordan, A Word from the Loki Faber and Faber, Irish poet published in the United Kingdom
Carol Rumens, Best China Sky
Labi Siffre, Blood on the Page
R.S. Thomas, No Truce with the Furies
Charles Tomlinson, Jubilation

Anthologies in the United Kingdom
Simon Armitage, Tony Harrison and Sean O'Brien, Penguin Modern Poets 5 (Penguin)
Eavan Boland, Carol Ann Duffy and Vicki Feaver, Penguin Modern Poets 2, Penguin
Roderick Watson, editor, The Poetry of Scotland: Gaelic, Scots and English, 1380–1980, Edinburgh: Edinburgh University Press (anthology)
Stella Chipasula and Frank Chipasula, editors, The Heinemann book of African women's poetry, London: Heinemann (anthology)

Criticism, scholarship and biography in the United Kingdom
Robert F. Garratt, editor, Critical essays on Seamus Heaney,

United States
Meena Alexander, River and Bridge, Toronto: TSAR Press and New Delhi: Rupa, by an Indian writing living in and published in the United States and India
Meena Alexander, River and Bridge, Toronto: TSAR Press and New Delhi: Rupa, by an Indian writing living in and published in the United States and India
Ralph Angel, Nether World
John Ashbery, Can You Hear, Bird?
Matthew Rohrer, ‘’A Hummock in the Malookas’’
Joseph Brodsky: On Grief and Reason: Essays, New York: Farrar, Straus & Giroux Russian-American
Henri Cole, The Look of Things
Nicholas Coles & Peter Oresick, For a Living (University of Illinois Press)
Alice Fulton, Sensual Math
Michael S. Harper, Honorable Amendments
Fanny Howe, O'Clock
Walter K. Lew, editor, Premonitions: The Kaya Anthology of New Asian North American poetry, New York: Kaya Productions
James Merrill, A Scattering of Salts (his last book)
Carl Rakosi, Poems, 1923-1941
Mary Oliver, Blue Pastures
Michael Palmer, At Passages
Molly Peacock, Original Love
Carl Phillips, Cortége
Giorgos Seferis, Complete Poems (in English), translated by Edmund Keeley and Philip Sherrard

Criticism, scholarship and biography in the United States
Helen Vendler, The Breaking of Style: Hopkins, Heaney, Graham, Harvard University Press
John Hollander, The Gazer's Spirit: Poems Speaking to Silent Works of Art, criticism

The Best American Poetry 1995
Richard Howard is the guest editor for The Best American Poetry 1995 (David Lehman, series editor). Howard changes the rules of inclusion for this year: "[P]oets whose work has appeared three or more times in this series are here and now ineligible, as are all seven former editors of the series." A total of 75 poems are included.

Poems from these 75 poets were in this year's anthology:

Margaret Atwood
Sally Ball
Catherine Bowman
Stephanie Brown
Lewis Buzbee
Cathleen Calbert
Rafael Campo
William Carpenter
Nicholas Christopher
Jane Cooper
James Cummins
Olena Kalytiak Davis
Lynn Emanuel
Elaine Equi
Irving Feldman

Donald Finkel
Aaron Fogel
Richard Frost
Allen Ginsberg
Peter Gizzi
Jody Gladding
Elton Glaser
Albert Goldbarth
Beckian Fritz Goldberg
Laurence Goldstein
Barbara Guest
Marilyn Hacker
Judith Hall
Anthony Hecht
Edward Hirsch

Janet Holmes
Andrew Hudgins
T. R. Hummer
Brigit Pegeen Kelly
Karl Kirchwey
Carolyn Kizer
Wayne Koestenbaum
John Koethe
Yusef Komunyakaa
Maxine Kumin
Lisa Lewis
Rachel Loden
James Longenbach
Robert Hill Long
Gail Mazur

J. D. McClatchy
Heather McHugh
Susan Musgrave
Charles North
Geoffrey O'Brien
Jacqueline Osherow
Molly Peacock
Carl Phillips
Marie Ponsot
Bin Ramke
Katrina Roberts
Michael J. Rosen
Kay Ryan
Mary Jo Salter
Tony Sanders

Stephen Sandy
Grace Schulman
Robyn Selman
Alan Shapiro
Reginald Shepherd
Angela Sorby
Laurel Trivelpiece
Paul Violi
Arthur Vogelsang
David Wagoner
Charles H. Webb
Ed Webster
David Wojahn
Jay Wright
Stephen Yenser

Other in English
Aharon Shabtai, Ha-lev ("The Heart"), Hebrew
The Labourers of Herakles

Works published in other languages
Listed by nation where the work was first published and again by the poet's native land, if different; substantially revised works listed separately:

Denmark
Katrine Marie Guldager, Styrt, publisher: Gyldendal
Klaus Høeck:
1001 Digt, publisher: Gyldendal
Hommage, publisher: Basilisk

French language
Andree Chedid, Par dela les mots (Lebanese resident of France, writing in French)
Michel Deguy, A ce qui n'en finite pas; France
Denise Desautels, Cimetières: La rage muette, autour de photographies de Monique Bertrand, Montréal: Éditions Dazibao; Canada
Claude Esteban, Quelqu'un commence à parler dans une chambre, Flammarion; France

India
Listed in alphabetical order by first name:
Amarjit Chandan, Jarhan, Aesthetic Publications, Ludhiana; Punjabi-language
Basudev Sunani,  Aneka Kichhi Ghatibaara Achhi, Nuapada: Eeshan-Ankit Prakashani; Oraya-language
Chandrakanta Murasingh, Holong Kok Sao Bolong Bisingo, Agartala: Shyamlal Debbarma, Kokborok Sahitya Sanskriti Samsad; India, Kokborok-language
Debarati Mitra, Kavitasamagra, Kolkata: Ananda Publishers; Bengali-language
Dilip Chitre, Ekoon Kavita – 2, Mumbai: Popular Prakashan; Marathi-language
Kedarnath Singh, Uttar Kabir aur Anya Kavitayen, Delhi: Rajkamal Prakashan; Hindi
Namdeo Dhasal, Ya Sattet Jeev Ramat Nahi; Marathi-language
Nirupama Dutt, Ik Nadi Sanwali Jahi ("A Stream Somewhat Dark"); Panchkula: Aadhar Prakashan; Punjabi-language
Nirendranath Chakravarti, Shotyo Shelukash, Kolkata: Ananda Publishers; Bengali-language
Saroop Dhruv, Salagti Havao, Ahmedabad: Samvedan Sanskritic Manch, Ahmedabad; Gujarati-language
Udayan Vajpeyi; Hindi-language:
Kuchh Vakya, New Delhi: Vani Prakashan
Pagal Ganitagya Ki Kavitayen, New Delhi: Vani Prakashan

Spain
Matilde Camus, Vuelo de la mente ("Mind flight")

Other languages
Stanisław Barańczak, Slon, traba i ojczyzna ("The Elephant, the Trunk, and the Polish Question"), light verse; Kraków: Znak; Poland
Mario Benedetti, El olvido está lleno de memoria ("Oblivion Is Full of Memory"), published in Spain, Uruguay
Christoph Buchwald, general editor, and Joachim Sartorius, guest editor, Jahrbuch der Lyrik 1995/96 ("Poetry Yearbook 1995/96"), publisher: Beck; anthology; Germany
Chen Kehua, Qiankantou shi ("Head-hunting Poems") Chinese (Taiwan)
Limaza tarakt al-hissan wahidan (Why did you leave the horse alone?), 1995. English translation 2006 by Jeffrey Sacks

Awards and honors
Nobel prize: Seamus Heaney

Australia
C. J. Dennis Prize for Poetry: Bruce Beaver - Anima and Other Poems
Dinny O'Hearn Poetry Prize: Selected poems 1956-1994 by Chris Wallace-Crabbe
Kenneth Slessor Prize for Poetry: Peter Boyle, Coming Home From the World
Mary Gilmore Prize: Jordie Albiston - Nervous Arcs

Canada
Gerald Lampert Award: Keith Maillard, Dementia Americana
Archibald Lampman Award: John Barton, Designs from the Interior
1995 Governor General's Awards: Anne Szumigalski, Voice (English); Émile Martel, Pour orchestre et poète seul (French)
Pat Lowther Award: Beth Goobie, Scars of Light
Prix Alain-Grandbois: Rachel Leclerc, Rabatteurs d'étoiles
Dorothy Livesay Poetry Prize: Linda Rogers, Hard Candy
Prix Émile-Nelligan: Marlène Belley, Les jours sont trop longs pour se mentir

India
 Sahitya Akademi Award : Kunwar Narayan for Koi Doosra Nahin
 Poetry Society India National Poetry Competition : Tabish Khair for Birds of North Europe & Gopi Kottoor for The Coffin Maker

New Zealand
Montana Book Award for Poetry: Michael Jackson, Pieces of Music
New Zealand Book Award for Poetry: Michele Leggott, Dia

United Kingdom
Cholmondeley Award: U. A. Fanthorpe, Christopher Reid, C. H. Sisson, Kit Wright
Eric Gregory Award: Colette Bryce, Sophie Hannah, Tobias Hill, Mark Wormald
Forward Poetry Prize Best Collection: Sean O'Brien, Ghost Train (Oxford University Press)
Forward Poetry Prize Best First Collection: Jane Duran, Breathe Now, Breathe (Enitharmon Press)
T. S. Eliot Prize (United Kingdom and Ireland): Mark Doty, My Alexandria
Whitbread Award for poetry: Bernard O'Donoghue, Gunpowder
National Poetry Competition : James Harpur for The Frame of Furnace Light

United States
Agnes Lynch Starrett Poetry Prize: Sandy Solomon, Pears, Lake, Sun
Aiken Taylor Award for Modern American Poetry: Maxine Kumin
AML Award for poetry to Marden J. Clark for "Snows"
Bernard F. Connors Prize for Poetry: Vijay Seshadri, "Lifeline"
Bollingen Prize: Kenneth Koch
National Book Award for poetry: Stanley Kunitz, Passing Through: The Later Poems
Poet Laureate Consultant in Poetry to the Library of Congress: Robert Hass appointed
Pulitzer Prize for Poetry: Philip Levine, The Simple Truth
Ruth Lilly Poetry Prize: A.R. Ammons
Wallace Stevens Award: James Tate
Whiting Awards: Lucy Grealy, James L. McMichael, Mary Ruefle
Fellowship of the Academy of American Poets: Denise Levertov

Deaths
Birth years link to the corresponding "[year] in poetry" article:
January 28 – George Woodcock, 82 (born 1912), Canadian poet, biographer, academic and prominent anarchist
February 6 – James Merrill, 68 (born 1926), American poet, of a heart attack
April 14 – Brian Coffey, 89 (born 1905), Irish poet and publisher
April 22 – Jane Kenyon, 47 (born 1947), American poet, of leukemia
May 11 – David Avidan, 61 (born 1934), Israeli Hebrew-language poet
July 7 – Helene Johnson, 89 (born 1906), African American poet, after osteoporosis
July 16:
May Sarton, 83 (born 1912), American poet, novelist and memoirist, of breast cancer
Stephen Spender, 86, (born 1909), English poet and essayist, of a heart ailment
September 3 – Earle Birney, 91 (born 1904), Canadian poet
September 13 – Maheswar Neog, 80 (born 1915), Indian, Assamese-language scholar and poet
September 18 – Donald Davie, 73 (born 1922), English poet, of cancer
September 26 – Lynette Roberts, 86 (born 1909), Welsh poet
October 22 – Kingsley Amis, 73 (born 1922), English novelist and poet, after a fall
November 5 – Essex Hemphill, 38 (born 1957), African American poet and gay activist, from complications relating to AIDS
December 30 – Heiner Müller, 66 (born 1929), German dramatist and poet

See also

Poetry
List of years in poetry
List of poetry awards

Notes

20th-century poetry
Poetry